The Venice TV Award is a television prize bestowed each year in September.  Two weeks after the Venice International Film Festival, a team of jurors from around the world meet in Venice to select the winners of 16 categories. Prerequisite for a nomination is that the production was first broadcast on a television station. The exception is the New Talent category. This award also highlights that the TV industry is a $260 billion industry worldwide with around 38,500 TV channels in operation and is supported by egta, ACT (Association of Commercial TV) and IMZ (International Music + Media Centre). This award brings national and international recognition for quality content.

Award Categories 

In 2022 Sky Atlantic’s Landscapers (TV series), a four-part starring Olivia Colman and David Thewlis, was handed the award for Best TV Series. Life & Rhymes won in Light Entertainment, "Romeo & Juliet", from the Royal National Theatre in the Performing Art category and in the Children/Youth "COP26: In Your Hands", a documentary giving a voice to a diverse group of young people, allowing them to air their concerns over climate change. Other UK winners on the night included Channel 4, which was rewarded in Best TV Film for Help (2021 television film) and ITV News in the News category for its coverage of the storming of the US Capitol building. In the Comedy category was Minx (TV series), HBO Max the winner.

In 2021, works from the United Kingdom were the most successful, winning five Golden Trophies. It's a Sin (TV series) (Channel 4), Creator: Russell T Davies was successful in TV Series. Channel 4 was also successful in Documentary with "The School That Tried To End Racism". BBC Production "Anthony" won in Best TV Film while Sky took two wins, one in Comedy Two Weeks to Live (TV series) and a second in Light Entertainment with "Rob & Romesh Vs.". Globo Brazil won three Gold Trophies (Telenovela, Cross Platform, Branded Entertainment). Productions from United States won two Gold Trophies, Australia, Portugal, and Austria, one each.
Nominees and winners were rewarded from 29 countries: United Kingdom, Germany, USA, Brazil, India, France, Japan, Sweden, Italy, Canada, Czech Republic, Denmark, Estonia, Finland, Iceland, Spain, Austria, Australia, Belgium, The Netherlands, South Africa, Turkey, Philippines, Poland, Portugal, Qatar, Russia, Israel and Singapore.

2020 "The New Pope" (Sky Italy) with Jude Law and John Malkovich was successful in TV series. United Kingdom were most successful, collecting 4 Gold Trophies: Sky "Breeders" in Comedy Category,  ITV "Digital Gulag" in Documentary category, BBC in Children/Youth with "The Snail and the Whale" and Endemol struck gold in the Light Entertainment Section with "Master Chef Australia".  Productions from United States and Brazil won two Gold Trophies each.
Nominees and Winner were rewarded from United Kingdom, France, United States, Brazil, Germany, Italy, India, Singapore, Sweden, Czech Republic, Australia, Spain, Israel, Hong Kong, Qatar, Belgium, Finland, Russia, Austria, Canada, Chile, Hungary, Japan, Poland, Portugal, South Africa, South Korea, Switzerland, Turkey.

2019 Nominees from the United Kingdom were most successful, collecting 4 Gold Trophies: Sky won with "Chernobyl" (co-produced by HBO) and with "Art of Drumming" in the Performing Arts category. BBC took the Comedy award with "Don’t Forget the Driver" and also struck gold in the Youth section with "My Life I Will Survive".
Rewards went as well to France, Brazil, Germany, India, USA, Singapore, Sweden, Italy, Ireland, Czech Republic, Australia, Spain, Israel, Hong Kong, Qatar, Malaysia, Lithuania, New Zealand, Croatia, Taiwan, Norway, Belgium, Finland, The Netherlands and Russia.

2018 the leading countries were United Kingdom and Germany, each with 2 Gold Trophies. United Kingdom won in Documentary with Mosul (Channel4/Mongoose Production) and Light Entertainment - Cruising with Jane McDonald (Channel 5). German Winners were 4Blocks in TV Series (TNT Series) and Generation 44 in Best TV Movie Generation 44 (ARD) produced by Zieglerfilm.

Supporting Associations
ACT (Association of Commercial TV) - The Association of Commercial Television in Europe represents the interests of the leading commercial broadcasters in 37 European countries and is committed to the promotion of original TV content, and the preservation of copyright.

EGTA (European Group of Television Advertising) - The European Association of Advertising Solutions Marketers via Screens and / or Audio Platforms is a non-profit association based in Brussels. The aim of the association is to promote television advertising on a political and social level.

IMZ (International Music + Media Center) - The IMZ International Music + Media Center is a non-profit organization founded in 1961 under the auspices of UNESCO to preserve the performing arts as a cultural asset, and in and through promote audiovisual media. 
Co-funded by the Creative Europe Programme of the European Union.

Gold Winners 2022 Venice TV Award

Gold Winners 2021 Venice TV Award

Gold Winners 2020 Venice TV Award

Gold Winners 2019 Venice TV Award

Gold Winners 2018 Venice TV Award

References

External links 
Venice TV Award
egta
ACTE
IMZ

Italian television awards